Malá Franková is a village and municipality in the Kežmarok District of the Prešov Region of north Slovakia. It is traditionally inhabited by Gorals, as one of their westernmost settlements (along with Veľká Franková and Osturňa).

History
Historical records first mention the village in 1568.

Geography 
Malá Franková is at an altitude of 750 metres, covers an area of 10.808 km², and has a population of about 180 people.

Notable people 

 Ján Vosček (* 1924 – † 2015) - Slovak politician and justice of the Constitutional Court of the Czech and Slovak Federal Republic

References

External links
https://web.archive.org/web/20071217080336/http://www.statistics.sk/mosmis/eng/run.html

Villages and municipalities in Kežmarok District